Orbital Corporation Limited, formerly Orbital Engine Corporation Limited pioneered by Ralph Sarich, is an Australian company based in Balcatta, Western Australia, that aims to provide clean engine technologies and alternative fuel systems with reduced environmental impact from gas emissions and improved fuel economy.

Consulting services 
Design, manufacturing, development and testing facilities have been established at the Balcatta facility. Orbital has developed infrastructure in engine design and modelling, numerical analysis, computational fluid dynamics, combustion and fuel system development, rapid-turn-around prototyping, and engine-management system software and hardware design.

Autogas systems 
Orbital Autogas Systems, a former subsidiary of Orbital Corporation, used to produce a retrofit LPG system applicable to a range of vehicles. Orbital Liquid LPG injection (LLi) is claimed to be the latest generation in automotive LPG fuel systems, promising substantial fuel savings, improved fuel consumption and reduced pollution. Injection of LPG into the engine as a liquid rather than a vapour is claimed to improve engine volumetric efficiency, producing more power from less fuel. Due to falling demand for automotive LPG conversions, and the resulting decline in profitability, the business was closed in December 2015. The assets and ongoing customer and supplier contracts were sold to Sprint Gas (Aust) Pty. Ltd. for approximately A$500,000

Variable-fuel engine 
A technology named FlexDI purports to improve emissions and fuel consumption in internal combustion engines designed to accept any common fuel type. The invention is being promoted to marine, recreational and light commercial vehicle markets including autorickshaws.

In 2003, the company was awarded a Banksia Award for its innovative combustion technology—winning in the category 'Leadership in Sustainable Product Design'.

The Orbital Redback heavy fuel engine using FlexDI was chosen in 2012 to power an unmanned aerial vehicle (UAV)  manufactured by AAIs Australian division Aerosonde.

See also
 Orbital engine

References

Further reading
Sydney Morning Herald, October 26, 2005. Orbital turns to its next big hope - rickshaws. By Matt O'Sullivan
Powersports Business,  December, 2004    Orbital expects improvement in 2005.
Hoover's – Factsheet on Orbital Corporation Limited
Scootering USA – December 10, 2007. Bajaj Provides Update on the Launch of the Direct Injection Autorickshaw

Companies listed on the Australian Securities Exchange
Engineering companies of Australia
Fuel injection systems
Two-stroke gasoline engines
Companies based in Perth, Western Australia
Companies established in 1989